Penney Ravine is a small ravine on Ardery Island in the Windmill Islands. It is on the northern side of the island just west of center. Discovered in February 1960 by a biological field party from Wilkes Station. Named by Antarctic Names Committee of Australia (ANCA) for Richard L. Penney, biologist at Wilkes Station in 1959 and 1960.

Canyons and gorges of Antarctica
Landforms of Wilkes Land